The Kanawha minnow (''Phenacobius teretulus') is a species of North-American freshwater fish in the family Cyprinidae. It is found only in the New River (of upper Kanawha River) drainage in North Carolina, Virginia and West Virginia.

References

Phenacobius
Taxa named by Edward Drinker Cope
Fish described in 1867
Taxonomy articles created by Polbot